Gottfried Kustermann (born 7 October 1943) is a retired West German sports shooter. He competed at the 1972 and 1976 Summer Olympics in three small-bore rifle events with the best result of seventh place in 1972. Kusterman won an individual world title in 10 meter air rifle in 1970, as well as several team medals between 1970 and 1978.

References

1943 births
Living people
German male sport shooters
Olympic shooters of West Germany
Shooters at the 1972 Summer Olympics
Shooters at the 1976 Summer Olympics
Sportspeople from Munich